The Bismarck Monument in Hamburg is a memorial sculpture located in the St. Pauli quarter dedicated to Otto von Bismarck. It is one of 240 memorials to Bismarck worldwide and is the largest and probably best-known of these Bismarck towers. The monument stands near the jetties of Hamburg port on the Elbhöhe, today a local recreation area. The architect was Johann Emil Schaudt; the sculptor was Hugo Lederer.

History
The site of the monument was previously occupied by the Elbpavillon restaurant which was removed in 1901. Mayor Johann Georg Mönckeberg established a citizens' commission to erect the monument at the site.

The Bismarck Monument cost 500,000 Goldmarks to erect, and it was completed in 1906.  The building of the monument was documented by the photographer Wilhelm Weimar, who worked for the Hamburg Museum für Kunst und Gewerbe.

Architecture

The designers created a large network of catacombs beneath the monument. In the years 1939 to 1940, they became an air-raid shelter, offering protection for up to 650 people. The architect's intent for the catacombs remain unknown, however, as they, and the whole interior of the monument, are no longer accessible for safety reasons. In the 1970s, a soldier who had served in the British army during the occupation in Germany discovered a tunnel beneath the Bismarck memorial which led to a Nazi hideout while in Hamburg. He contacted the Daily Mirror newspaper which, in turn, contacted the Burgermeister in Hamburg. After viewing the tunnel that the soldier had described, authorities decided to seal it.

See also
Bismarck Monument
Bismarck Memorial
Bismarck tower

References

Literature
Jörg Schilling: Distanz halten - Das Hamburger Bismarckdenkmal und die Monumentalität der Moderne, Wallstein-Verlag, Göttingen 2006,

External links

Photo: Interior views of the Bismarck monument
Historical aerial photo of the Bismarck monument
 Armanic article on the Schwarze Sonne mentioning the Bismarck Monument

Bismarck family
Buildings and structures in Hamburg-Mitte
Tourist attractions in Hamburg
Hamburg
Art Nouveau architecture in Hamburg
Art Nouveau sculptures and memorials